= The Florida Agriculturist =

Newspaper

- Publisher: Kilkoff & Dean. Christopher O. Codrington
- Ceased publication: 1907
- Language: English
- Headquarters: Deland, Florida
- Country: United States
- ISSN: 1940-7440
- OCLC number: 1376795

The Florida Agriculturist was a weekly newspaper published in Deland, Florida from 1878 until 1907. It was afterwards published monthly and was relocated to Jacksonville until ceasing operation in 1911. The paper also served as a plant catalog.

The paper was published by Kilkoff & Dean. Christopher O. Codrington served as editor. E.O. Painter took over in 1887.

Prior to the Chinese Exclusion Act, the paper recommended Chinese laborers in lieu of African Americans. In 1888 the paper documented an ice plant established in DeLand in 1886. It covered orange packing.

Editions are available online.

The Codrington family home is extant. Codrington also published the Deland News.

In 1927, E. O. Painter's printing company published a history of Volusia County. It published The Colonization of Ormond, Florida in 1931. Painter also established a fertilizer business.
